Gerrit Jan Heijn (14 February 1931, Zaandam – 9 September 1987) was a Dutch businessman, who was a top manager of Ahold until his death in 1987. His grandfather was Albert Heijn, who founded the family business, and his older brother was also named Albert Heijn, who was the founder of Ahold. His son, Ronald Jan Heijn, played for the Dutch national field hockey team.

Death
On 9 September 1987, he was kidnapped near his villa in Bloemendaal, Netherlands by Ferdi Elsas. Although Elsas murdered him only a few hours after the kidnapping, he pretended that Heijn was still alive for a long time and asked for ransom. He sent the Heijn family Gerrit Jan's glasses and severed little finger. Elsas was caught when he started spending banknotes of the ransom he received, of which the numbers had been recorded.

He served a prison sentence and was freed in 2001. Elsas gave directions to Heijn's body, which was buried in the woods near Renkum. Gerrit Jan Heijn was cremated on 9 April 1988 in Driehuis. Elsas was hit by an excavator on 3 August 2009 while riding his bicycle near the town of Vorden, Gelderland and died in a hospital at Zutphen.

Other
The 2004 movie The Clearing is loosely based on Heijn's kidnapping and murder.

See also
List of kidnappings
List of solved missing person cases

References

1931 births
1980s missing person cases
1987 deaths
20th-century Dutch businesspeople
Dutch chief executives in the retail industry
Dutch murder victims
Formerly missing people
Kidnapped businesspeople
Kidnapped Dutch people
Male murder victims
Missing person cases in Europe
People from Zaanstad
People murdered in the Netherlands